TuS Dehrn is a German association football club from the Dehrn quarter in the city of Runkel, Hesse.

History 
The club was established as the gymnastics club Germania Dehrn on 16 July 1905 and is today a sports club of over 1000 members that in addition to its football side has departments for gymnastics, karate, and table tennis, as well as offering fitness programs.

The football department was established late in the history of the club (1945) following World War II and it was at this time that the current name of the association was adopted. Throughout their history, the footballers have played as a lower tier local side and today compete in the Kreisoberliga Limburg-Weilburg (IX).

Famous players 
Bernd Hölzenbein, played for Bundesliga side Eintracht Frankfurt and earned 40 caps with Germany

External links 
Official team site

Football clubs in Germany
Football clubs in Hesse
Association football clubs established in 1905
1905 establishments in Germany